The 1928 Baylor Bears football team represented Baylor University in the Southwest Conference (SWC) during the 1928 college football season. In their third season under head coach Morley Jennings, the Bears compiled an 8–2 record (3–2 against conference opponents), tied for third place in the conference, and outscored opponents by a combined total of 219 to 54. They played their home games at Cotton Palace in Waco, Texas. A. E. "Pete" Jones was the team captain.

Schedule

References

Baylor
Baylor Bears football seasons
Baylor Bears football